Superior is a city in, and the county seat of, Douglas County in the U.S. state of Wisconsin. The population was 26,751 at the 2020 census. Located at the junction of U.S. Highway 2 and U.S. Highway 53, it is immediately north of, and adjacent to, both the Village of Superior and the Town of Superior. Its neighborhoods include Billings Park, North End, South Superior, Central Park, East End, Allouez, and Itasca. Billings Park, South Superior, East End, and North End each have small business districts.

Superior is at the western end of Lake Superior in northwestern Wisconsin. Bordered by Saint Louis, Superior, and Allouez bays, the city is framed by two rivers: the Nemadji and the Saint Louis. Superior and the neighboring city across the bay, Duluth, Minnesota, form a single metropolitan area called the Twin Ports. They share a harbor that is one of the most important ports on the Great Lakes. Superior was the final port of call for  before her sinking on November 10, 1975. It is an industrial city, with ship harbors along two sides, several large rail yards, an oil refinery, and shipyard.

History
The first log cabin in Superior was erected in September 1853 on the banks of the Nemadji River, at the same time that ground was broken for construction of the locks and ship canal at Sault Ste. Marie, Michigan. This was intended to allow ships to bypass the rapids at that site. Superior was incorporated as a city on March 25, 1889. Around the same time Superior became the seat of newly formed Douglas County. Immediately there was eagerness for a railroad from Lake Superior to the Pacific Coast, and investment flowed in, but then the Panic of 1857 hit, investment slowed, and the population of the new city collapsed from 2500 to 500.

25 years later the Northern Pacific Railway and other rail lines finally arrived, fulfilling the dream of a rail and water highway from coast to coast. In 1883 General John H. Hammond formed the Land and River Improvement Company, which developed much of West Superior, including the West Superior Iron and Steel plant. Numerous grain, coal and lumber businesses formed in the same period.

In the Boom Period from 1888 to 1892, Land and River Improvement and others built impressive architect-designed business blocks on Tower Avenue, seeing Superior as the "new Chicago." Many of the investors were from out East, so the buildings received names like the New Jersey Block and the Maryland Block. By 1892, population was 34,000. Then the Panic of 1893 hit, and development slowed again.

Between 1890 and 1920, the city was heavily settled by migrants from the eastern United States as well as immigrants from over 15 countries, including England, Scotland, Ireland, Norway, Sweden, Finland, Belgium, Poland, Germany, Austria, Italy, Hungary, and Croatia.

Geography
Most of Superior is level with a gradual slope toward Lake Superior.

Climate

Demographics

2020 census
As of the census of 2020, the population was 26,751. The racial makeup of the city was 87.7% White, 2.1% Native American, 1.8% Black or African American, 0.9% Asian, 0.1% Pacific Islander, 0.6% from other races, and 6.7% from two or more races. Ethnically, the population was 2.1% Hispanic or Latino of any race.

2010 census
As of the census of 2010, there were 27,244 people, 11,670 households, and 6,548 families residing in the city. The racial makeup of the city was 91.5% White, 1.4% African American, 2.6% Native American, 1.2% Asian, 0.2% from other races, and 3.1% from two or more races. Hispanic or Latino people of any race were 1.4% of the population.

There were 11,670 households, of which 28.3% had children under the age of 18 living with them, 37.2% were married couples living together, 13.5% had a female householder with no husband present, 5.4% had a male householder with no wife present, and 43.9% were non-families. 34.6% of all households were made up of individuals, and 12% had someone living alone who was 65 years of age or older. The average household size was 2.23 and the average family size was 2.84.

The median age in the city was 35.4 years. 21.3% of residents were under the age of 18; 13.4% were between the ages of 18 and 24; 26% were from 25 to 44; 25.9% were from 45 to 64; and 13.5% were 65 years of age or older. The gender makeup of the city was 49.0% male and 51.0% female.

2000 census
As of the 2000 census, there were 27,368 people, 11,609 households, and 6,698 families residing in the city. The population density was 740.9 people per square mile (286.1/km2). There were 12,196 housing units at an average density of 330.2 per square mile (127.5/km2). The racial makeup of the city was 94.26% White, 0.68% Black or African American, 2.23% Native American, 0.84% Asian, 0.04% Pacific Islander, 0.26% from other races, and 1.69% from two or more races. 0.83% of the population were Hispanic or Latino of any race. 15.8% were of German, 13.6% Norwegian, 10.9% Swedish, 9.3% Irish, 7.2% Polish, 6.9% Finnish and 5.3% American ancestry.

There were 11,609 households, out of which 27.9% had children under the age of 18 living with them, 41.3% were married couples living together, 12.3% had a female householder with no husband present, and 42.3% were non-families. 34.2% of all households were made up of individuals, and 13.9% had someone living alone who was 65 years of age or older. The average household size was 2.26 and the average family size was 2.91.

The city's median household income was $31,921, and the median family income was $41,093. Males had a median income of $33,712 versus $22,073 for females. The per capita income for the city was $17,253. 13.4% of the population and 9.6% of families were below the poverty line. 16.0% of those under the age of 18 and 7.8% of those 65 and older were living below the poverty line. In the city, the population was spread out, with 22.7% under the age of 18, 12.9% from 18 to 24, 27.9% from 25 to 44, 21.6% from 45 to 64, and 15.0% who were 65 years of age or older. The median age was 36 years. For every 100 females, there were 92.4 males. For every 100 females age 18 and over, there were 88.8 males.

Economy

The transportation industry accounts for more than 1,000 jobs. The Twin Ports of Duluth–Superior, the largest in the Great Lakes, welcomes both domestic and foreign vessels. Bulk solids (such as grain) make up much of the tonnage handled by the port, and the silos of such port facilities are visible on the Superior waterfront. In 2004, the port's busiest year since 1979, more than 41.4 million metric tons were shipped out of the port. Burlington Northern Railroad has an operations hub in Superior.

Cenovus Energy operates a refinery in Superior.The refinery is located along a pipeline connecting western Canada and the Midwest. On April 26, 2018, there was an explosion at the refinery around 10:00 AM. Douglas County then issued a state of emergency due to heavy smoke. There were 20 initial injuries, and five were transported to the hospital in Duluth, Minnesota. No fatalities were reported.

Growing area manufacturers include FenTech, Inc., which manufactures vinyl doors and windows; Charter NEX Films, a producer of plastic films; Genesis Attachments, manufacturer of shears and grapples; Amsoil, a producer of synthetic motor oil and lubricants; and Crane Song Ltd., a manufacturer of discrete Class A electronics for recording studios. Fraser Shipyards also provides many jobs to local residents. They repower and repair commercial vessels.

Arts and culture
Superior Public Library is located in downtown Superior.

Parks and recreation
There are several parks in the city, including the second largest municipal forest in the United States, located in the city's Billings Park neighborhood.

Government
The current mayor of Superior is Jim Paine, who was first elected in 2017.

Education

Superior is served by the Superior School District, which has one high school, one middle school, and six elementary schools, with a total enrollment of over 5,000 students. Superior High School enrolls more than 1,500 students. Its mascot is Sparty the Spartan. Over 1,400 students are also enrolled in the Maple School District. Parochial schools include the Catholic Cathedral School, the Protestant-based Maranatha Academy and Twin Ports Baptist School.

The University of Wisconsin–Superior (UWS) is a public liberal arts college. Originally opened as a state Normal School (teacher's college), UWS became part of the University of Wisconsin System in 1971.

Northwood Technical College offers skill development and technical education, with an enrollment of over 2,200.

Media

Print media
The Superior Telegram, local twice-weekly print newspaper
The Superior Catholic Herald, published by the Roman Catholic Diocese of Superior
Positively Superior, a bi-monthly business-to-business magazine that focuses exclusively on Superior and Douglas County

Radio

KDKE 102.5 FM – classic Country
KUWS 91.3 FM – Ideas network of Wisconsin Public Radio
WDSM 710 AM – News Talk Information
WDUL 970 AM – Sports
WGHF-LP 93.7 FM – Superior Seventh-Day Adventist Church
WSSU (FM) 88.5 FM – WPR News & Classical

Television

Many of the stations serving Superior come from the Duluth market:
6 KBJR-TV (NBC/CBS) – Superior
3 KDLH (The CW) – Duluth
8 WDSE (PBS) – Duluth
10 WDIO-DT (ABC) – Duluth
21 KQDS (Fox) – Duluth
27 KCWV (Family Chanel) – Duluth

Infrastructure

Transportation

Major highways
The following routes are located within the city of Superior.

 Interstate 535 – John Blatnik Bridge
 U.S. Highway 2 – Belknap Street(western portion) E. 2nd Street/US Highway 53 (eastern portion)
 U.S. Highway 53
 Wisconsin Highway 35 – Tower Avenue
 Wisconsin Highway 105 – Central Avenue

Airport
Richard I. Bong Airport (KSUW) serves the city and surrounding communities. Duluth International Airport in Duluth is the nearest commercial airport, with service on three commercial and two cargo airlines, as of December 2018.

Bus
The Duluth Transit Authority provides Superior and nearby Duluth with fixed-route and dial-a-ride public bus service.

Rail

A proposed Amtrak route running between Duluth and the Twin Cities has a planned stop in Superior and is the final stop before arriving in Duluth or the first stop after departing from Duluth. Previously, Superior was served by passenger rail until 1984 at the Superior Union Station.

Notable people

James H. Agen, Wisconsin State Representative
Wallace W. Andrew, Wisconsin State Representative
Morrie Arnovich, MLB All-Star outfielder
Dave Bancroft, MLB player and manager, member of the National Baseball Hall of Fame
David Francis Barry, photographer of the American West
David L. Bazelon, Judge of the U.S. Court of Appeals
Kris Benson, Major League Baseball player
Niko Bogojevic, professional wrestler for WWE
Richard Bong, Medal of Honor recipient and top flying ace of the U.S. in World War II
C.A. Bottolfsen, 17th and 19th Governor of Idaho
Charles J. Bouchard, Wisconsin State Representative
Dave Bronson, Mayor of Anchorage, Alaska
Esther Bubley, photographer
Solanus Casey, priest and a "blessed" of the Catholic Church
Carl Cashion, MLB player
Agnes Charbonneau, Wisconsin State Representative
Frank Christopherson Jr., Wisconsin State Representative
Paul Clemens, U.S. Army general
Charles H. Crownhart, Justice of the Wisconsin Supreme Court
Albert W. Durley, Wisconsin State Representative and lawyer
Russ Ennis, MLB player
Daniel R. Fitzpatrick, editorial cartoonist
William R. Foley, Wisconsin State Representative
James B. French, Wisconsin State Representative
Bud Grant, head coach of the Minnesota Vikings from 1967–1983; 1985, member of the Canadian Football Hall of Fame and Pro Football Hall of Fame
Lawrence M. Hagen, Wisconsin State Representative
Ogden H. Hammond, diplomat and New Jersey politician
Christine Hoberg, singer-songwriter and music producer
William E. Hoehle, Wisconsin State Representative
George Hudnall, Wisconsin State Senator
Eastman Johnson, artist, co-founder of the Metropolitan Museum of Art
Doc Kelley, NFL player
Bill LaBounty, songwriter/musician
Tuffy Leemans, NFL player, member of the Pro Football Hall of Fame
Irvine L. Lenroot, U.S. Representative, U.S. Senator, and Judge of the U.S. Court of Customs and Patents Appeals
Victor Linley, Wisconsin State Senator
Robert J. MacDonald, Michigan State Senator
James S. Mace, Wisconsin State Representative
Gordon MacQuarrie, journalist and outdoors writer
Bruce Mathison, NFL player
Edgar G. Mills, Wisconsin State Representative and Senator
Thomas Brooks Mills, Wisconsin politician
Thomas B. Murray, Wisconsin State Representative
Ernie Nevers, member of both College and Pro Football Halls of Fame
Marian Nixon, actress
Ray J. Nye, Wisconsin State Senator
Scott O'Brien, special teams coordinator of the New England Patriots
Bob Olson, football player
Byron C. Ostby, Wisconsin State Representative
Dave Peterson, coach of the United States men's national ice hockey team
Angus B. Rothwell, Superintendent of Public Instruction of Wisconsin
Augustine Francis Schinner, Bishop of the Roman Catholic Diocese of Superior and Roman Catholic Diocese of Spokane
Lewis B. Schwellenbach, U.S. Secretary of Labor
Frank D. Sheahan, Wisconsin State Representative
Mike Sislo, NHL
Henry Clay Sloan, Wisconsin State Representative
Edward Stack, Wisconsin State Representative
James S. Stack, Wisconsin State Representative
Don Stivers, artist
Doug Sutherland, NFL player
Tarzan Taylor, NFL player
David Tipton, NFL player
Leonard Patrick Walsh, United States District Court judge in Washington, D.C.
Albert D. Whealdon, Wisconsin State Representative
Jarvis White, Wisconsin State Representative
Jeffrey Williams, NASA astronaut
Oliver E. Williamson, winner of the 2009 Nobel Prize in economics
F. A. Woodward, Superior mayor, Arizona State Senator

Religion
Superior is the episcopal see of the Roman Catholic Diocese of Superior, and the Cathedral of Christ the King in Superior is the mother church of the diocese. Saint Francis Xavier Catholic Church, located in the East End of Superior, has been noted for its architecture. Christ Evangelical Lutheran Church is the only congregation of the Lutheran Church Missouri Synod located in Superior. It recently moved from its original location on Belknap Street to a new campus on North 28th Street. Pilgrim Lutheran Church is located along Belknap Street near the University of Wisconsin–Superior. United Presbyterian Church represents the Presbyterian Church U.S.A as a merger of three churches in a new church building. Faith United Methodist Church is the result of a merger of the city's original three Methodist Churches: First, Central and Trinity. Many small churches dot the city's neighborhoods, representing most major denominations.

See also
Richard I. Bong Memorial Bridge
John A. Blatnik Bridge
Lakehead Pipeline

References

Further reading
Bartlett, Elizabeth Ann. Making Waves: Grassroots Feminism in Duluth and Superior (Minnesota Historical Society Press, 2016). xvi, 325 pp.

External links

Superior, Wisconsin government website

 
Cities in Wisconsin
County seats in Wisconsin
Cities in Douglas County, Wisconsin
Wisconsin populated places on Lake Superior
Inland port cities and towns in Wisconsin